"500 Keys" is the twenty-first and penultimate episode of the twenty-second season of the American animated television series The Simpsons. It first aired on the Fox network in the United States on May 15, 2011. It was written by John Frink and directed by Bob Anderson.

Plot
After returning from a shop that sells returned wedding cakes, Maggie gets locked in the car with the key inside. While searching for the spare keys (which soon proves unnecessary, as Maggie is able to free herself), the Simpsons discover a collection of keys to every door in Springfield. Lisa uses a key and finds a hidden classroom full of theater props underneath the school. She is intrigued by the discovery, and shares it with Principal Skinner, but when she brings along the school newspaper, they only find shelves full of "Banned Band Books". It becomes apparent that Skinner and Superintendent Chalmers are hiding something when they snatch the key from Lisa. She has the key replicated and returns to the door on her own, and finds the classroom has been hidden behind a shoddy set of bookshelves. She then sees a mysterious figure writing "The children are on Bus 23" on the chalkboard. Lisa is determined to solve the mystery of the hidden room.

Meanwhile, Bart tries causing mayhem with the keys but accidentally does good deeds with them, and ends up with the key to the city. Marge and Maggie find a key for a wind-up toy train called "The Pooter Toot Express", which makes farting noises when it moves. The toy gets away from them and they chase it throughout the city. Homer uses a key to get into the Duff brewery with Barney and goes joyriding in the Duff blimp.

To get more information about Bus 23, Lisa and Bart ask Nelson. Nelson explains Bus 23 was a bus full of children that was supposed to drive over a dangerous ice bridge but was never heard from again, as Skinner and Superintendent Chalmers covered up the loss of the children. Lisa tells Bart about the room, and the two ask Homer to fly them to the lake where the ice bridge would be. Lisa falls out of the blimp and into the water, where she sees the submerged Bus 23, and Homer dives in to save her. However, they find that all the "children" inside it are actually mannequins. Homer and Lisa are saved by the Pooter Toot Express, which knocks over a tree for them to grab onto just before it falls apart. The mysterious figure is revealed to be Otto, who is relieved to discover he is not responsible for the death of the children, as he was the driver of Bus 23.

Chalmers and Skinner try to flee to Bolivia, but are stopped by Bart, who has Skinner's car key and forces them to explain everything. Years earlier, the school had received a large grant for the purpose of improving its classrooms. Skinner cashed the check but left the money in his pants pocket, and his mother inadvertently destroyed it when she washed his laundry. With the help of Groundskeeper Willie, Chalmers and Skinner built a fake classroom and photographed it to fool the government, using rented mannequins to pose as students. They put the mannequins on Bus 23 to have Otto return them before being charged for the extra day, but the ice bridge gave out and the bus went into the lake. Chalmers and Skinner apologize to Otto for letting him believe he killed a busload of students, and all is forgiven. No further mention of the rental money is made, though Skinner says that they anticipated the wedding cakes but not Maggie locking herself in the car, and Chalmers chastises him for not anticipating her birth.

The epilogue ends with Otto driving his bus across an icy bridge, believing that his complement is full of mannequins, when he is actually transporting real children. As his bus is close to tipping off the bridge, he comments that perhaps they will fall off slowly as in Inception; he is wrong and his bus falls into the river. The episode ends with the sound of Otto searching for his keys to let the children off the bus to swim to shore.

Production 
The episode features a cameo from Albert Brooks as Hank Scorpio, a one-time character from the eighth season episode, "You Only Move Twice". The chalkboard gag was written to correct the error from the previous episode "Homer Scissorhands" where guest star Kristen Schaal's surname was spelled incorrectly as "Schall" in the credits. Schaal eventually thanked the producers for the name correction through Twitter. The blackboard gag "It's 'Schaal', not 'Schall'" was only seen in the televised version; the version that was streamed on Hulu.com, Disney+, and seen in televised reruns used the blackboard gag, "Guinea pigs should not be used as guinea pigs".

During the closing credits, the jingling of a set of keys is heard, followed by a solo violin rendition of the show's theme.

Reception 
In its original American broadcast on May 15, 2011, "500 Keys" was viewed by an estimated 6 million households and received a 2.5 rating/7% share among adults between the ages of 18 and 49. This means that it was seen by 2.5% of all 18- to 49-year-olds, and 7% of all 18- to 49-year-olds watching television at the time of the broadcast. The episode stayed even in the rating from the previous episode, "Homer Scissorhands".

The A.V. Club commented that while the episode was "amusing" it "never comes near great stuff" and also called the episode "disposable". He ultimately gave the episode a B.

References

External links 
 
 "500 Keys" at theSimpsons.com

2011 American television episodes
The Simpsons (season 22) episodes